Bauntovsky District (Babanta (Bauntyn) aimag) is an administrative and municipal district (raion), one of the twenty-one in the Republic of Buryatia, Russia. It is located in the northeast of the republic. Its administrative center is the rural locality (a selo) of Bagdarin. As of the 2010 Census, the total population of the district was 9,667, with the population of Bagdarin accounting for 49.0% of that number.

Etymology
The district is named after Lake Baunt.

Geography
Most of the district's territory is located on the Vitim Plateau. To the west rises the Ikat Range and to the northeast, the Babanty Mountains, stretching from southwest to northeast from the Big Khapton and Little Khapton ridges to the Vitim River. The Southern Muya Range rises in the northwestern sector of the district, with lake Dorong. The Baunt Depression, along which the Tsipa River flows, stretches between the Tsipikan Mountains and the South Muya Range. Baunt, after which the district is named, as well as Busani are lakes located in the depression. To the southwest the Kapylyushi lake is on the northern side of the Tsipikan banks.

Administrative and municipal status
Within the framework of administrative divisions, Bauntovsky District is one of the twenty-one in the Republic of Buryatia. The district is divided into nine selsoviets, comprising twenty-four rural localities. As a municipal division, the district is incorporated as Bauntovsky Municipal District. Its nine selsoviets are incorporated as nine rural settlements within the municipal district. The selo of Bagdarin serves as the administrative center of both the administrative and municipal district.

Demographics
As of the 2010 Census the ethnic breakdown of Bauntovsky District was the following:
Russians: 76.08%Buryats: 14.07%Evenks: 5.04%Others: 4.81%

References

Notes

Sources

Districts of Buryatia
 States and territories established in 1925